Kim Yunmi (Hangul: 김윤미, Hanja: 金潤美) (born December 1, 1980 in Seoul) is a South Korean short track speed skater, who won gold medals in the 3000 m relay at the 1994 and 1998 Winter Olympics.

Kim won her first Olympic gold medal at the 1994 Winter Olympics in Lillehammer at the age of 13 years and 85 days, making her the youngest-ever Olympic gold medallist and breaking a record previously held by Marjorie Gestring. Due to this, the ISU later set the minimum age limit to be 15-years-old.

Since 2004 she has lived in Maryland, United States where she teaches speed skating.

References

External links
 
 

1980 births
Living people
South Korean female short track speed skaters
Short track speed skaters at the 1994 Winter Olympics
Short track speed skaters at the 1998 Winter Olympics
Olympic short track speed skaters of South Korea
Olympic gold medalists for South Korea
Olympic medalists in short track speed skating
South Korean female speed skaters
Medalists at the 1998 Winter Olympics
Medalists at the 1994 Winter Olympics
Asian Games medalists in short track speed skating
Short track speed skaters at the 1996 Asian Winter Games
Short track speed skaters at the 1999 Asian Winter Games
Asian Games gold medalists for South Korea
Asian Games silver medalists for South Korea
Asian Games bronze medalists for South Korea
Medalists at the 1996 Asian Winter Games
Medalists at the 1999 Asian Winter Games
21st-century South Korean women